Inner-City Muslim Action Network (IMAN), founded in 1996 by Rami Nashashibi, is one of the leading Muslim charity organizations in the United States. 

According to the Inner-City Muslim Action Network, IMAN seeks "to utilize the tremendous possibilities and opportunities that are present in the community to build a dynamic and vibrant alternative to the difficult conditions of inner city life."  IMAN sees understanding Islam as part of a larger process to empower individuals and communities to work for the betterment of humanity. Consequently, IMAN has initiated a diverse set of community programs and projects with the hope of changing the conditions in the inner city, in particular the communities on Chicago's South and Southwest Side. IMAN provides a range of direct social services through the IMAN/ICIC Food Pantry, IMAN Health Clinic, and IMAN's Career Development Initiative (ICDI). "Takin' It To The Streets" is IMAN's most popular and well-known project. The festival draws people from all over the Chicago area for a day of festivities, musical performances, sports tournaments, and carnivals. 

Directors are listed as:  Rami Nashashibi, Ayat Elnoory, Asad Jafri, M. Altaf Kaiseruddin.

References

External links
IMAN Website
Takin' it to the Streets 2016 Website

Islamic organizations established in 1996
Islamic charities based in the United States
Non-profit organizations based in Chicago